Heterolysis may refer to:
 Heterolysis (biology), the apoptosis induced by hydrolytic enzymes from surrounding cells
 Heterolysis (chemistry), a chemical bond cleavage of a neutral molecule generating a cation and an anion

See also 
 Homolysis (disambiguation)

Science disambiguation pages